This is a list of notable Industrial heritage sites throughout the world that have been inscribed on "top tier" heritage lists, including the UNESCO World Heritage List, Grade I listed buildings (England and Wales), Category A listed buildings (Scotland), Grade A listed buildings (Northern Ireland), National Historic Sites of Canada, National Historic Landmarks (USA), etc.

UNESCO World Heritage Sites

Grade I listed industrial buildings and structures in England and Wales, Category A in Scotland, Grade A in Northern Ireland

National Historic Sites of Canada

National Historic Sites and National Historical Parks (USA) 
Note: most sites listed below are also National Historic Landmarks.

National Historic Landmarks (USA)

See also
 Industrial archaeology
 List of industrial archaeology topics
 History of Science and Technology

References

Heritage sites
Heritage sites